Paul Asquith (born 12 August 1993) is an Australian professional rugby union player. His primary position is centre, but is also an accomplished fly-half and fullback who can also play on the wing.

Career
Asquith played his junior Rugby union for Kiama, New South Wales and junior Rugby league for his home town Jamberoo, New South Wales as well as Kiama. He was chosen for the St George Dragons S. G. Ball Cup team in 2010 before moving to Rugby sevens in 2012. He played 43 games for Australia during the 2012-13 and 2013-14 seasons.

He made his debut for the Rebels against the Stormers in a 57-31 defeat at AAMI Park coming on as a replacement for Jonah Placid who went off injured in the process of scoring a try. He plays his club rugby for Southern Districts in Sydney and also for the Greater Sydney Rams in the National Rugby Championship.

In July 2017, he joined Scarlets in Wales for the 2017-18 season. He played all three trial games and made his Pro14 debut off the bench again in the first round against the Southern Kings and scored his first try in the second round against Zebre. He returned to Australia after four years with the Scarlets. Asquith played 79 games scoring 17 tries and 3 penalty goals

References

External links
 Paul Asquith - Scarlets profile
 Paul Asquith - Melbourne Rebels

1993 births
Australian rugby union players
Rugby union centres
Melbourne Rebels players
Greater Sydney Rams players
Living people
Rugby union wings
Australian rugby sevens players
Expatriate rugby union players in Wales
Australian expatriate rugby union players
Scarlets players